Blue Rose (Голубая роза - Blaue Rose) was a Symbolist artist association in Moscow from 1906 to 1908.

Characteristics

The group emphasised color as a 'tonal' medium to construct rhythm in a painting and the elimination of shape and contour.

Members

Members included Anatolii Arapov, Petr Bromirsky, V.  Drittenpreis, Nikolai Feofilaktov, Artur Fonvizen, Nikolai Krymov, Pavel Kuznetsov, Ivan Knabe, Nikolai Milioti, Vasilii Milioti, Aleksandr Matveev, Nikolai Ryabushinsky, Nikolai Sapunov, Martiros Saryan, Serge Sudeikin and Petr Utkin.

Inspiration

Their style was inspired by the Russian Impressionist, Viktor Borisov-Musatov, the name of the group was used for their exhibition in 1906 and was derived from the poem Blue Flower by the poet Novalis.

Vladimir Mayakovsky, the poet/critic said of the group in 1907 "The artists are in love with the music of colour and line." 
Wassily Kandinsky was an associate of the group, being greatly taken with their artistic viewpoint he contributed paintings to a few of their exhibitions in Moscow between 1906 and 1910.

See also
 Der Blaue Reiter, an art group in Munich
 Green Flower, an art group in Latvia

References
The Blue Rose: Russian Symbolism in Art by John E. Bowlt

External links
Exhibition info

Russian art movements